The Scottish Waterways Trust was an independent registered charity, established as part of The Waterways Trust in 2000. In 2012 The Waterways Trust merged its operations in England and Wales with the Canal & River Trust, and the organisation in Scotland became an independent charity.

In the face of significant financial challenges, the Scottish Waterways Trust ceased to operate in 2019, issuing the following statement:

"Since 2000, we have been connecting people with the heritage, wildlife and green open spaces of our canals and inspiring people to get active, improve their health and mental wellbeing, employment prospects and community life. To secure the future of our innovative canal-based projects and the positive impact our work has on local communities, we are pleased to say that, from 1st May 2019, our canal college® and Canal Heritage activities will be taken forward by environmental charity, Keep Scotland Beautiful."

See also
List of waterway societies in the United Kingdom

References

External links

https://www.oscr.org.uk/about-charities/search-the-register/charity-details?number=43477

Transport charities based in the United Kingdom
Waterways organisations in Scotland